The Battle of Gwiju, which occurred in 1019, was the major battle during the Third Goryeo–Khitan War (1018-1019), fought between the Khitan-led Liao dynasty of China and the Goryeo dynasty of Korea.

After crossing the Aprok River, the Liao dynasty troops invaded the Goryeo dynasty. The Goryeo general Gang Gam-chan dammed a stream and released it as the Liao troops were crossing. Despite suffering significant casualties, some Liao troops marched to Gaegyeong, the capital of Goryeo.

During their campaign, general Gang Gam-chan cut the supplies of the Liao troops and harassed them relentlessly. Exhausted, the Liao troops decided to retreat hastily northward. Monitoring the movement of their troops, general Gang Gam-chan attacked them in the vicinity of Gwiju, ending in a complete victory for the Goryeo dynasty.

Aftermath 
After the battle, peace negotiations followed and the Liao dynasty did not invade Korea again. Korea entered in a long and peaceful period with its foreign neighbours across the Yalu River. The victory at the Battle of Kuju is regarded as one of the three greatest military victories (other victories are Battle of Salsu and Battle of Hansando) in Korean history. It is said through texts in the Goryeosa and Goryeo Dogyeong that tens of thousands of Liao soldiers held prisoners during the battle were relocated to Namgyeong, today's Seoul, while some worked as engineers in the nation's silk industry and booming economy.

See also
 Goryeo-Khitan Wars
 First Goryeo-Khitan War
 Second Goryeo-Khitan War
 Third Goryeo-Khitan War
 Gang Gam-chan
 Siege of Kusong

References

Guju
Guju
Goryeo
Khitan history
Kuju
History of North Pyongan Province
Kuju
11th century in Korea
1019 in Asia